Trawsfynydd nuclear power station is a decommissioned Magnox nuclear power station situated in Snowdonia National Park in Gwynedd, Wales.  The plant, which became operational in 1965, was the only nuclear power station in the UK to be built inland, with cooling water that was taken from the man-made Llyn Trawsfynydd reservoir which also supplies the hydro-electric Maentwrog power station. It was closed in 1991. Its planned decommissioning by Magnox Ltd was expected to take almost 100years, but in 2021 the Welsh government arranged for the power station to be redeveloped using small-scale reactors.

History
The power station, which takes its name from the nearby village of Trawsfynydd, was designed by Basil Spence. The construction, which was undertaken by a consortium involving Crompton Parkinson, International Combustion, Fairey Engineering and Richardsons Westgarth, and known as the Atomic Power Constructions (APC), began in July 1959, and both of the reactors were in operation by March 1965, with the station opening fully in October 1968, at a cost of £103million. It had two Magnox reactors producing 470megawatts (MW) in total. The reactors were supplied by APC and the turbines by Richardsons Westgarth. The civil engineering work was undertaken by Holland, Hannen & Cubitts and Trollope & Colls. The architectural consultant for the buildings was Sir Basil Spence and the landscape architect was Sylvia Crowe. The setting for the power station which Crowe developed is designated Grade II* on the Cadw/ICOMOS Register of Parks and Gardens of Special Historic Interest in Wales.

Nuclear flasks were transported to Trawsfynydd on a section of the former Bala to Blaenau Ffestiniog railway that had been closed in January 1961. A single track was restored northwards with an entirely new line through the centre of Blaenau Ffestiniog that connected to the Conwy Valley branch. Beginning on 20 April 1964, nuclear flasks could be transported by rail between destinations such as Sellafield in Cumbria. The last train to carry nuclear material from Trawsfynydd left on 22 April 1997 hauled by EWS Loco 37426. The line was subsequently mothballed. In 2016, enthusiasts, who want to create a heritage railway, began clearing vegetation along the route but have since been halted and are negotiating a new licence to clear.

Decommissioning
Trawsfynydd was shut down in 1991. The Nuclear Decommissioning Authority subsidiary Magnox Ltd is decommissioning the site.
The work is expected to last decades.

Beginning in 1993, the highly-radioactive spent fuel rods were removed from both Magnox reactors and sent by rail to Sellafield. This was completed in 1997. Intermediate level waste  such as on the walls of the cooling ponds or pipes  is being carefully removed using robots over the next decades. Contaminated material is stored in a specially-designed building on the site. It will eventually be removed for deep burial in the UK's proposed geological disposal facility. Between 2020 and 2026, the top parts of the two reactor buildings were to be partially demolished to reduce their height, but the steel reactor cores  that housed the fuel rods  will not be removed because they are still far too radioactive. The final clearance of the site is scheduled to begin in 2071. By 2083, the area was expected to have been restored to its pre-nuclear state; 124 years after construction started and 92 years after the closure of Trawsfynydd power station.

Reestablishment
The Welsh government has decided to redevelop the plant using small-scale reactors, as a step toward meeting the UK's targets for reducing carbon emissions. In 2021, the government chose Mike Tynan of Westinghouse to lead a company tasked with developing the new reactors.
On 20 May 2022 the Government announced that the NDA will work with Cwmni Egino (the Welsh Development Agency company) to develop land adjacent to the site for a 300MW small modular reactor (SMR). Cwmni Egino said it will now discuss with interested parties and hoped to announce plans within one year. In December 2022, a second consortium presented its proposals to use their own design of SMR in competition to the original bid.

See also

Wylfa Nuclear Power Station, shutdown Magnox reactor in Anglesey
Energy policy of the United Kingdom
Nuclear power in the United Kingdom
Energy use and conservation in the United Kingdom

Citations
References

Bibliography

External links

 Nuclear Decommissioning Authority site (Trawsfynydd page)
 Trawsfynydd , Nuclear Engineering International wall chart, January 1961
 Some photos of Trawsfynydd power station
 Aerial views of the power station, via The People's Collection

Former nuclear power stations in Wales
Nuclear power station
Registered historic parks and gardens in Gwynedd